The 2020–21 Swedish Basketball League season was the 28th season of the Swedish Basketball League (SBL), the top tier basketball league on Sweden. Borås Basket is the defending champion.

Norrköping Dolphins won its 8th national title after defeating Södertälje BBK 4–0 in the finals.

Teams

On 16 June 2020, it was announced Fryshuset, winners of the Superettan, were promoted to the SBL. On 25 June 2020, Wetterbygden Stars withdrew from the league due to the lack of financial support.

League table

Playoffs

Bracket

Quarter-finals
Södertälje Kings vs. Umeå

Norrköping Dolphins vs. Köping Stars

Borås vs. Nässjö

Luleå vs. Jämtland

Semi-finals
Södertälje Kings vs. Jämtland

Norrköping Dolphins vs. Nässjö

Finals 
Södertälje Kings vs. Norrköping Dolphins

References

External links
Official Basketligan website

Basketligan seasons
Sweden
Basketligan